Gillett School District may refer to:
Gillett School District (Wisconsin)
Gillett School District (Arkansas) (defunct)